Aristotelia leonhardi is a moth of the family Gelechiidae. It is found in Austria.

The wingspan is about 10 mm. The forewings are leather-yellow. Adults have been recorded on wing in June.

References

Moths described in 1907
Aristotelia (moth)
Moths of Europe